Undulambia arnoulalis is a moth in the family Crambidae described by William Schaus in 1925. It is found in Mexico.

The wingspan is about 18 mm. The wings are thickly suffused with mikado and snuff brown.

References

Moths described in 1925
Musotiminae